Harvey W. Carmichael (20 August 1881 – 1940) was a Scottish professional footballer who played as a goalkeeper.

References

1881 births
1940 deaths
People from Tillicoultry
Scottish footballers
Association football goalkeepers
Tillicoultry Rovers F.C. players
Clackmannan F.C. players
East Stirlingshire F.C. players
Grimsby Town F.C. players
Millwall F.C. players
Hartlepool United F.C. players
English Football League players
Sportspeople from Clackmannanshire